The 2010 Harlow District Council election took place on 6 May 2010 to elect members of Harlow District Council in Essex, England. One third of the council was up for election and the Conservative party stayed in overall control of the council.

After the election, the composition of the council was
Conservative 18
Labour 10
Liberal Democrats 5

Background
The Conservative party gained a majority on the council at the last election in 2008 and after the election had 19 councillors, compared to 8 for the Liberal Democrats and 6 for Labour. In April 2009 the Liberal Democrats gained a seat in Staple Tye after a by-election, which had previously been held by independent David Kirton, who had been elected as a Conservative but suspended from the party in October 2008. However, in September 2009 councillor Linda Pailing of Netteswell ward left the Liberal Democrats to become an independent and then would go on to join the Conservatives in January 2010.

Election result
At the same time as the Conservative party gained the Harlow parliamentary constituency from Labour at the 2010 general election, the party also held control of Harlow council. However Labour made gains to win 6 of the 11 seats contested, while the Liberal Democrats lost the seats of Bush Fair, Mark Hall and Staple Tye.

Ward results

Bush Fair

Church Langley

Great Parndon

Harlow Common

Little Parndon and Hare Street

Mark Hall

Netteswell

Old Harlow

Staple Tye

Sumners and Kingsmoor

Toddbrook

References

Harlow District Council elections
2010 English local elections
May 2010 events in the United Kingdom
2010s in Essex